Rio Dewanto (born in Jakarta, Indonesia on August 28, 1987) is an Indonesian actor and model of Javanese descent.

Career
Dewanto began his debut career as film actor when played his cameo role in the two films, titled Pintu Terlarang (2009) and Ratu Kosmopolitan (2010). In 2011, Dewanto played the lead role as Hendra/Ping Hen, in a drama film that emphasized Indonesian pluralism which was directed by Hanung Bramantyo, titled ? (née Question Mark). The next  year, Dewanto played as John Evans, the main character in the film Modus Anomali which was directed by Joko Anwar.

Dewanto played his fourth role as Octa in a sequel of a film, titled Arisan! 2 (2011) and sang the original soundtrack song for "Cinta Terlarang". For his performance in these films, Dewanto earned his first 2012 Favorite Supporting Actor trophy award at Indonesian Movie Awards. Dewanto also starred with Atiqah Hasiholan (now his wife) in the film Hello Goodbye where they filmed the movie in South Korea.

In addition, Dewanto starred in Indonesian small screens, including the popular drama which aired in SCTV, Love in Paris season 1 and 2.

Personal life
In mid-2013, Dewanto married fellow film actress Atiqah Hasiholan. The ceremony was held in the Pulau Kelor, Kepulauan Seribu.

Filmography

Film

Television

Awards and nominations

References

External links
 
 
 
  Berita tentang Rio Dewanto
  Rio Dewanto : Arti Perempuan
  Modus Anomali di Mata Joko Anwar, Rio Dewanto, dan Surya Saputra

1987 births
Indonesian male television actors
Singers from Jakarta
21st-century Indonesian male singers
Living people
Javanese people